Osman Ahmed Boakye is a Ghanaian politician and was a member of the first parliament of the fourth republic of Ghana, elected in 1992 to represent Asokwa west constituency, under the membership of the National Democratic Congress.

Early life and education 
Boakye was born on 24 November 1948 in the Ashanti Region. He attended T. I. Ahmadiyya Secondary  School in Kumasi and the University of Science and Technology (now the Kwame Nkrumah University of Science and Technology) for a pre degree course prior to entering the University of Ghana in Greater Accra Region where he obtained a bachelor's degree in Administration. He worked as research officer before going into politics.

Politics 
Boakye began his political career in 1992 when he became the parliamentary candidate for the National Democratic Congress (NDC) to represent Asokwa west constituency prior to the commencement of the 1992 Ghanaian parliamentary election. He assumed office as a member of the first parliament of the fourth republic of Ghana on 7 January 1993 after being pronounced winner at the 1992 Ghanaian election.

Personal life 
He is a Muslim.

References 

Living people
Ghanaian MPs 1993–1997
National Democratic Congress (Ghana) politicians
1948 births
University of Ghana alumni
Ghanaian Muslims
T.I. Ahmadiyya Senior High School (Kumasi) alumni